Brahmadatta of Anga (6th century BCE) was an ancient Indian King of Anga.

Life 
Brahmadatta was older contemporary to Bimbisara of Magadha. He defeated Bhatiya, father of Bimbisara. After assention to the thrown of Magadha Bimbisara  avenged his father's defeat and killed Brahmadatta.The campaign was successful, Anga was annexed, and prince Kunika (Ajatashatru) was appointed governor at Champa

See also
Bimbisara
Anga

References

6th-century BC rulers in Asia